Batanaea or Batanea (the Hellenized/Latinised form of Bashan) was an area of the Biblical Holy Land, north-east of the Jordan River, to the west of Trachonitis.

History
Bataneaea was one of the four post-Exile divisions of the area of Bashan. 

Today, Batanaea is more commonly called Nuqrah, and runs north-south along the east side of the Lejah (Trachonitis) and the Hauran (Auranitis), from Salkhad on the south, to Tells Khaledyeh and Asfar on the north. It is, on average, 12 miles wide, and for 30 miles along it extends the Gebel Hauran, a range of hills, whose central plateau is 2670 ft. above sea level and whose highest point is 6400 ft.

In the 1st century BCE the land was acquired by Herod the Great. He established a Jewish community there of Jews from Babylon who were brought to Batanaea for the purpose of maintaining order against the banditry of the Trachonites. Upon Herod's death in 4 BCE, Batanaea passed to his son Philip as part of his inheritance. In some sources Philip is referred to as "Tetrarch of Batanea" with the capital at Caesarea Philippi, though his lands were more extensive than this.

On his death in 34 CE Batanea became briefly part of the Roman province of Syria, but in 37 CE was established as a kingdom and passed to king Herod Agrippa I, and in 53 CE to his son, king Herod Agrippa II. Following his death, however, it was once again annexed to the Roman province of Syria.

New Testament
Thus it is distinct from the other, more prominent Bethany in the gospels. This contradicts the general consensus, which is that Bethany across the Jordan is situated on the Jordan River near Jericho, on either the east or west bank of the river.

Maps

References

Further reading
Edinburgh New Philosophical Journal
Hebrew Bible regions
Hebrew Bible mountains
New Testament places
Geography of Syria